Gabriel Asakura     (born November 12, 1988) is a Brazilian professional baseball pitcher. He attended West Los Angeles College and Cal State Los Angeles and played with the Palm Springs Power in the Southern California Collegiate Baseball Association and the Peninsula Oilers in the Alaska Baseball League. He represented Brazil at  2013 World Baseball Classic.

References

External links
Baseball America

1988 births
2013 World Baseball Classic players
Brazilian baseball players
Brazilian expatriate baseball players in the United States
Brazilian people of Japanese descent
Cal State Los Angeles Golden Eagles baseball players
Living people
Sportspeople from São Paulo